The House of Limburg (in german: Haus von Limbourg) was a dynasty which can be traced back in the male line as far as Henry, count of Limburg, whose mother Jutta was heiress of Frederick, Duke of Lower Lorraine in the House of Ardenne–Luxembourg. Henry was also related to the counts of Arlon. Waleran I was probably his father-in-law rather than his father.

By marriage, the family acquired:
 The county of Luxemburg in 1214, which then passed to a younger branch, the House of Luxemburg.
 The county of Berg in 1218.

In 1288, the family lost the duchy of Limburg, which was conquered by John I, duke of Brabant. The elder branch, holding the county of Berg, died out in 1348. The younger branch of Luxembourg acceded to the Empire.

Genealogy of the House of Limburg

See also 
 List of rulers of Limburg
 House of Luxembourg

References

Sources
 Kupper, Jean-Louis (2007), "Les origines du duché de Limbourg-sur-Vesdre", Revue belge de Philologie et d'Histoire Année, 85 (3–4): 609–637, doi:10.3406/rbph.2007.5096
 Gade, John A. (1951). Luxemburg in the Middle Ages. E.J. Brill.
 Loud, Graham A.; Schenk, Jochen, eds. (2017). The Origins of the German Principalities, 1100-1350: Essays by German Historians. Routledge.
 Péporté, P. (2011). Historiography, Collective Memory and Nation-Building in Luxembourg. Brill.
 Gislebertus (of Mons) (2005). Chronicle of Hainaut. Translated by Napran, Laura. The Boydell Press.
 Baldwin, John W. (2002). Aristocratic Life in Medieval France: The Romances of Jean Renart and Gerbert de Montreuil, 1190-1230. The Johns Hopkins University Press.
 Schnerb, Bertrand (2010). "Battle of Steppes". In Rogers, Clifford J. (ed.). The Oxford Encyclopedia of Medieval Warfare and Military Technology. 3. Oxford University Press.
 Droege, G., 'Pfalzgrafschaft, Grafschaften und allodiale Herrschaften zwischen Maas und Rhein in salisch-staufischer Zeit’, Rheinische Vierteljahrsblätter 26 (1961), pp. 1–21.
 Wisplinghoff, E.,Zur Reihenfolge der lothringischen Pfalzgrafen am Ende des 11. Jahrhunderts, in Rheinische Vierteljahrsblätter 28 (1963) pp. 290–293.
 Bleicher, W. Contributions in Hohenlimburgher Heimatblätter fűr den Raum Hagen und Isenlohn. Beiträge zur Landeskunde. Monatsschrift des Vereins fűr Orts- und Heimatkunde Hohenlimburg e.V. Drűck Geldsetzer und Schäfer Gmbh. Iserlohn
 Reuter, Timothy, Germany in the Early Middle Ages 800–1056, New York: Longman, 1991.
 Bernhardt, John W. (2002). Itinerant Kingshiop & Royal Monasteries in Early Medieval Germany ,c.936-1075. Cambridge University Press.
Alfred Noss: Die Münzen von Berg und Jülich-Berg. Band I. Hrsg. Stadt Düsseldorf, Verlag Kress und Hornung, München 1929, S. 2.

External links
 Lower Rhine Nobility
 Wikipedia.de

Gallery

House of Limburg